Saraswati Vidya Mandir, Bokaro Steel City (SVM Bokaro) established in May 1994 (Originally Shifted from Saraswati Sishu Mandir, Bokaro which is established in 1967) is an English medium co-educational school affiliated to the Central Board of Secondary Education, New Delhi, India. This is one of the schools run by the Vidya Bharati Akhil Bharatiya Shiksha Sansthan, New Delhi, a non-profit making organisation. The name of its first principal is Shri Sheo Kumar Singh. The current principal of the school is Shri Mrityunjoy Sahay.

The school motto is Siksharth Aaiye, Sevarth Jaiye (Come To Learn, Go to Serve).

References

Private schools in Jharkhand
Vidya Bharati schools